Old Sturbridge Village is a living museum located in Sturbridge, Massachusetts which recreates life in rural New England during the 1790s through 1830s. It is the largest living museum in New England, covering more than 200 acres (81 hectares). The Village includes 59 antique buildings, three water-powered mills, and a working farm. Third-person costumed interpreters demonstrate and interpret 19th-century arts, crafts, and agricultural work. The museum is popular among tourists and for educational field trips.

History 
Prior to European colonization, the Nipmuck people inhabited the Quinebaug River. In the early 19th century, the land on which Old Sturbridge Village now stands was a farm owned by David Wight which included a sawmill, a gristmill, and a millpond. The millpond was dug in 1795 and still powers the mills today. In 1795, Wight's son went to Boston to conduct some business on behalf of his father. While in Boston, he bought tickets to the Harvard Lottery which was a fund-raising technique for Harvard College. He won $5,000 (equivalent to $ in today's dollars). He gave his father money to pay off the mortgage on his farm and logged the timber of the cedar swamp which today is the millpond. After the logging was complete, they dug the pond with a team of oxen and a scoop. This entire process took two and a half years.

George Washington Wells started a small spectacle shop in Southbridge, Massachusetts in the 1840s which became the American Optical Company. His sons Channing, Albert (called "AB"), and Cheney followed him into the business, which continued to expand. In 1926, AB began to shop for antiques, and this influenced Cheney to collect early American timepieces and Channing to collect fine furniture. By the early 1930s, AB had more than 45 rooms full of antiques in his Southbridge home.

The Wells family and others formed the Wells Historical Museum in 1935, gave it title to the various collections, and charged it with the care and exhibition of the artifacts. In July 1936, the Museum's trustees met to determine how the collections would best be presented to the public. AB wanted to create a small cluster of buildings in a horseshoe around a common, but his son George B proposed creating a live village with operating shops and a source of water power. Within a week of the meeting, the Museum purchased David Wight's farm and soon after hired Malcolm Watkins as the first curator of the museum, which they called Quinnebaug Village in honor of the river. Architect Arthur Shurcliff was called in to help lay out a suitable country landscape. By 1941, the Fitch House, the Miner Grant Store, and the Richardson House (now the Parsonage) were on the common and the Gristmill was in operation.

After a pause for World War II, George B.'s wife Ruth became acting director of the Village. They changed its name to Old Sturbridge Village and opened it on June 8, 1946. Attendance climbed, mostly through word of mouth. In a 1950 article in The Saturday Evening Post, the village was featured as "The Town That Wants to be Out of Date". By 1955, it acquired the Meetinghouse from the Fiskdale neighborhood of Sturbridge, the Salem Towne House from Charlton, Massachusetts, the Fenno House, the Friends Meetinghouse, the Pliny Freeman House, the Printing Office, and the District School.

On August 18, 1955, gale-force winds and a torrential downpour from Hurricane Diane created flood waters that broke dams in surrounding towns and flooded the Village, stranding 15 staff members. The Freeman Farmhouse was flooded and the Covered Bridge was swept off its foundation. Helicopters kept staff members supplied for three days until the waters receded. The damage was estimated to be $250,000 in 1955 dollars, but Village employees managed to re-open the Village in just nine days.

Structures and exhibits
Old Sturbridge Village has more than 40 structures, including restored buildings purchased and relocated from around New England, as well as some authentic reconstructions, and the entire village is divided into three main sections. The Center Village represents the center of town, with the town green as its focal point. Countryside consists of outlying farms and shops. The Mill Neighborhood features various commercial structures that rely upon the millpond for their power.

Center Village
The Center Village contains:
Friends Meetinghouse – a meetinghouse of the Religious Society of Friends, known as Quakers
Center Meetinghouse – churches often served as a location for town meetings, elections, lectures, and political events
Tin Shop – tin imported from England was used to make a variety of household goods
Salem Towne House – a prosperous farmer's home
Law Office – a small, free-standing office of a lawyer
Parsonage – the home of a Congregational minister and his family
Asa Knight Store – a country store, transported from its original location in Vermont
Thompson Bank – a bank that was originally located in Thompson, Connecticut
Fenno House – a historic house with exhibits that highlight domestic textile production
Fitch House – a residence exhibit that highlights children and family life
Small House – a small home based on those of less affluent families and renters, which was built from scratch at the village using period-appropriate techniques.
Printing Office
Cider Mill – a horse-powered mill for the production of hard cider
Shoe Shop – a historic ten footer, which was a small backyard shop structure built in the 18th and 19th centuries in New England to serve as a shoemaker's shop. They were forerunners of the large shoe factories that developed in New England later in the 19th century.
Town Pound – for the confinement of livestock found wandering loose
Bullard Tavern – an early 19th-century tavern room
The Stage Coach – a stage coach marked "Hartford & Worcester" which makes trips through Center Village

The Countryside
The Countryside section contains:
Blacksmith Shop – a shop where farm implements and other hardware were made and repaired and horses and oxen were shod
Bixby House – the home of the blacksmith
Cooper Shop – where wooden barrels, buckets, and pails were made
Pottery Shop – New England potters made utilitarian items out of local clay, such as milkpans, mugs, crocks, flowerpots, and mixing bowls
District School – a typical publicly funded one-room school
Covered Bridge – Covered bridges extended the longevity of wooden bridges in the harsh New England weather.

The Mill Neighborhood
Mill Neighborhood features:
Gristmill – uses water power to turn a 3,000-pound millstone for grinding grain
Sawmill – a working replica of an "up-and-down" sawmill powered by a reaction-type waterwheel
Carding Mill – a water-driven facility to prepare wool for spinning

Collections
Old Sturbridge Village has several buildings devoted to displaying their assorted collections of early American antiques.
Firearms – many displays feature firearms from colonial America through the post-Civil War era
Glass – there are three categories of displays: blown glass, molded glass, and pressed glass
Lighting Devices – early lighting devices from ancient oil lamps and candles to whale oil, camphene, and argand lamps
Herb Garden – a living collection of native and heirloom varieties of ornamental plants and those used for cooking, medicine, dying cloth, and making traditional crafts

Scenes from interactive exhibits

Programs 
The Village hosts history- and seasonal-themed events such as homeschool days, kids' summer camps, Christmas by Candlelight, Fourth of July, Halloween, and Thanksgiving. Old Sturbridge Village is frequently host to a naturalization ceremony on the fourth of July. In 2018, 152 new United States citizens were naturalized at Old Sturbridge Village.

The Village is a popular wedding location.

Appearances in TV and film 
Old Sturbridge Village has been used as a set in many historical movies, TV shows, and documentaries, including Hawaii (1966) starring Julie Andrews, Reading Rainbow (1984), Glory (1989), and Slavery and the Making of America (2005).

Filmmaker Ken Burns's Hampshire College undergraduate thesis was an educational film made at Old Sturbridge Village called Working in Rural New England. Burns remains a patron and supporter of the museum. Old Sturbridge Village now awards a yearly "Ken Burns Lifetime Achievement Award" to individuals who have made a significant contribution to the preservation of history through the arts. Recipients have included Norm Abram, Cokie Roberts, John Williams, Tom Brokaw, Sam Waterston, Doris Kearns Goodwin, and Laura Linney.

Old Sturbridge Academy Charter School 
In July, 2017, Old Sturbridge Village CEO Jim Donohue, who had previously founded the first charter school in Rhode Island, announced the opening of Old Sturbridge Academy Charter School, which would open in modular classrooms on the museum's premises the following fall.

See also 

 Living history
Crowd Site
Open-air museum

References

External links
Old Sturbridge Village official website

Museums in Worcester County, Massachusetts
Open-air museums in Massachusetts
Living museums in Massachusetts
Buildings and structures in Sturbridge, Massachusetts